St Martin Pomeroy was a parish church in the Cheap ward of the City of London. It was also known as St Martin Ironmonger Lane.

Location
The church stood on the east side of Ironmonger Lane in the Cheap ward of the City of London.  John Stow suggested that the name "Pomary" indicated that apple trees had once grown near the church. The patronage of the church belonged to the prior and canons of St Bartholomew the Great, until the dissolution of the priory, when it passed to the Crown.

In 1627 much of the north wall had to be rebuilt, and two years later the whole church was "repaired and beautified" at the cost of the parishioners. The church was destroyed in the Great Fire of London in 1666 and not rebuilt. Instead the parish was united with that of St Olave Jewry  and the site of the church retained as a burial ground.

References

Churches destroyed in the Great Fire of London and not rebuilt
Churches in the City of London
Former buildings and structures in the City of London
1666 disestablishments in England